The 83rd Mixed Brigade was a unit of the Spanish Republican Army created during the Spanish Civil War from the militarization of the Iron Column. It came to operate on the Teruel, Levante and Central fronts.

History

Front of Teruel 
The unit was created in March 1937, on the Teruel front, from the militarization of the Iron Column. The 83rd MB was integrated into the 41st Division, along with other recently militarized forces. Joaquín García-Morato Ruiz was appointed as head of the brigade. It went on to publish its own newspaper, the "Columna de Hierro", printed in Vinaroz.

In July the 83rd MB was sent to the Albarracín sector as reinforcement against the nationalist counteroffensive that followed the Battle of Albarracín. After its arrival in the area, it came to replace the Republican 42nd Division, which was left very broken after the nationalist attacks. At the beginning of August, the brigade was placed in the 64th Division of the 19th Army Corps. During the following days it had to resist the enemy counterattacks, which began on August 4 and lasted until August 21, managing to maintain its positions.

At the end of 1937 the unit, which was still attached to the 64th Division, participated in the Battle of Teruel. On December 30 the nationalists launched a counteroffensive that sought to lift the siege of Teruel, attacking in the Campillo sector. The 81st Mixed Brigade fell back under enemy pressure, losing Campilo and causing a breach in the front that would also drag the 83rd MB into its retreat. After the republican conquest of the Teruel capital, the unit was located on the left flank of the front, where it saw no outstanding activity.

Fighting in Levante 
At the end of the military operations in Teruel, the 83rd MB was again added to the 41st Division. In mid-April 1938, after the republican zone was cut in two, the unit was added to the Extremadura Division and destined for the coastal sector; attacked by the forces of Rafael García Valiño, the 83rd MB suffered severe attrition and on May 11 it had to be relieved by elements of the 14th Division. The following day the brigade fought in the Albocàsser-Les Coves de Vinromà sector.

In the La Iglesuela del Cid sector, the unit suffered severe damage from enemy attacks, having to give ground; by May 29 it was positioned in the Ares del Maestrat-La Llama sector. A day later, after giving ground and facing the danger of being surrounded, the 83rd MB withdrew together with the entire division towards Albocàsser, and then towards Castellón de la Plana. On June 10, the 83rd MB was covering part of the right flank of Castellón de la Plana, although on June 13 it had to face an enemy attack on the heights of "Choquera"; the brigade launched several counterattacks in the Borriol mountain range, although the assaults it was subjected to finally forced it to withdraw towards the capital of Castellón. After the fall of this city, the unit was withdrawn to the rear to undergo a reorganization.

End of the war 
After the end of the fighting in Levante, the unit was assigned to the 73rd Division, remaining as a general reserve of the Central Region Army Group (GERC). On March 8, 1939, under the rule of the National Defence Council, the 83rd MB was sent to Madrid in support of the Casadista forces, where it collaborated in the assault on the Jaca Position. Later it advanced on the urban center of Madrid, in support of the forces of Armando Álvarez Álvarez.

Controls 
 Commanders
 Joaquín García-Morato Ruiz

 Commissioners
 José Segarra Puig;
 Ernesto Orgaz Grau

 Chiefs of Staff
 Emilio Soler Serrano;
 Francisco Cardona Rosell;

See also 
 Iron Column
 Mixed Brigades

Notes

References

Bibliography 
 
 
 
 
 
 
 
 
 
 
 
 
 

Military units and formations established in 1937
Military units and formations disestablished in 1939
Mixed Brigades (Spain)
Militarized anarchist formations